WJ Las Vegas Daily News (Chinese: 世界日報 維加斯新聞; pinyin: Weijiaxi XinWen) is a daily Chinese Language free newspaper issued by World Journal, also known as Chinese Daily News, which is the largest Chinese language newspaper publisher in North America, for Chinese-American residents of Las Vegas.

WJ Las Vegas Daily News provides both online and offline media platforms including a newspaper, a website and a mobile application. Its Las Vegas branch is at 3325 West Sahara Avenue, Las Vegas, Nevada 89102.

References

Asian-American culture in Nevada
Newspapers published in Las Vegas
Chinese-language newspapers published in the United States
Non-English-language newspapers published in Nevada